The 1954–55 Iowa Hawkeyes men's basketball team represented the University of Iowa in intercollegiate basketball during the 1954–55 season. The team finished the season with a 19–7 record (11-3 in Big Ten), won the Big Ten title, and made the school's first trip to the Final Four.

Roster
The group of juniors on this team – Sharm Scheuerman, Bill Logan, Carl Cain, Bill Seaberg and Bill Schoof – are known to Hawkeye fans as the "Fabulous Five."

Schedule/results

|-
!colspan=9 style=|Non-conference
|-

|-
!colspan=9 style=| Conference

|-
!colspan=9 style=|NCAA tournament

Rankings

Awards and honors
 Carl Cain – Honorable Mention AP All-American

References

Iowa Hawkeyes men's basketball seasons
Iowa
NCAA Division I men's basketball tournament Final Four seasons
Iowa
Iowa Hawkeyes Men's Basketball Team
Iowa Hawkeyes Men's Basketball Team